Keshkak (also Romanized as Keshgak and Keshkag) is a village in Qaleh Miran Rural District, in the Central District of Ramian County, Golestan Province, Iran. At the 2006 census, its population was 740, in 160 families.

References 

Populated places in Ramian County